Lionfish may refer to:
 Genus Pterois, collectively known as the lionfish
 Red Lionfish (P. volitans), a significant invasive species off the East Coast of North America and in the Caribbean

Fish
 a number of fish species within family Scorpaenidae, mostly found in the Indo-Pacific:
Brachypterois serrulata, also known as the Pygmy Lionfish
 within genus Dendrochirus, collectively known as the dwarf lionfishes
Dendrochirus barberi, known as the Hawaiian Lionfish or Green Lionfish
Dendrochirus biocellatus, known as the Fu Chu Lionfish or Twinspot Lionfish
Dendrochirus brachypterus, known as the Hawaiian Lionfish
Dendrochirus zebra, known as the Zebra Lionfish
within genus Ebosia:
Ebosia bleekeri, also known as Bleeker's Lionfish
within genus Parapterois:
Parapterois heterura, also known as the Blackfoot Lionfish
within genus Pterois, collectively known as the lionfish:
Pterois antennata, also known as the Antennata Lionfish
Pterois miles, also known as the African Lionfish or Mombasa Lionfish
Pterois radiata, also known as the Clearfin Lionfish, Tailbar Lionfish, or Radiata Lionfish
Pterois volitans, also known as the Red Lionfish

Other
 USS Lionfish (SS-298), a United States Navy submarine

de:Feuerfische
fr:Rascasse
id:Lepu
he:זהרון
mk:Риба-лав
ja:ミノカサゴ
no:Drakefisker
pl:Skrzydlice (ujednoznacznienie)
pt:Peixe-leão
ru:Крылатка красная
sv:Drakfisk
th:ปลาสิงโต
vi:Cá sư tử
zh:獅子魚